Wagner da Silva Moreira (born May 27, 1988 in Ponta Grossa), or simply Mandagua, is a Brazilian full back. He currently plays for Paraná.

Contract
1 September 2006 to 1 September 2008

External links

CBF

1988 births
Living people
Brazilian footballers
Paraná Clube players
Association football defenders